Thomas R. Hawkins (1840 – February 28, 1870) was an African-American Union Army soldier during the American Civil War and a recipient of America's highest military decoration—the Medal of Honor—for his actions at the Battle of Chaffin's Farm.

Biography
Hawkins joined the Army as a substitute from Philadelphia, Pennsylvania on August 4, 1863, and became Sergeant Major of the 6th U.S. Colored Infantry Regiment on August 23. On September 29, 1864, he fought in the Battle of Chaffin's Farm, Virginia. He was discharged in May 1865 for wounds received in action.

More than five years later, on February 8, 1870, he was awarded the Medal of Honor for "rescue of regimental colors" during that battle.

Thomas Hawkins died of cancer at age 29 or 30 on February 28, 1870, and was buried in Columbian Harmony Cemetery in Washington, D.C.  His remains were moved to National Harmony Memorial Park in Landover, Maryland, in 1960 when the original cemetery closed and was sold. A memorial plaque was placed at his grave in 1997.

Hawkins' courage at New Market Heights is depicted in the painting Three Medals of Honor by artist Don Troiani, which was unveiled on June 24, 2013 at the Union League of Philadelphia.

Medal of Honor citation
Rank and organization: Sergeant Major, 6th U.S. Colored Troops. Place and date: At Chapins Farm, Va., September 29, 1864. Entered service at: Philadelphia, Pa. Birth: Cincinnati, Ohio. Date of issue: February 8, 1870.

Citation:

Rescue of regimental colors.

See also
List of Medal of Honor recipients
List of American Civil War Medal of Honor recipients: G–L
List of African American Medal of Honor recipients

Notes

References

External links

6th USCT Muster Roll

1840 births
1870 deaths
African Americans in the American Civil War
United States Army Medal of Honor recipients
Union Army soldiers
American Civil War recipients of the Medal of Honor
Burials at Columbian Harmony Cemetery
Burials at National Harmony Memorial Park
 Deaths from cancer in Washington, D.C.